LY3372689 is a drug candidate molecule under investigation to treat Alzheimer's disease. It targets the enzyme O-GlcNAcase. Its result is to reduce formation of tau protein tangles.

A molecule containing radioactive fluorine was used with a PET scan to show that LY3372689 binds in the human brain.

Eli Lilly and Company is recruiting subjects for a clinical trial. Some hospitals in Australia: St Vincent's Hospital, Sydney
Hornsby Ku-Ring-Gai Hospital, The Prince Charles Hospital, The Queen Elizabeth Hospital, Adelaide, Box Hill Hospital, and Delmont Private Hospital are involved. Results of the trial are expected by June 2024.

Chemical
The molecule contains three rings: thiazole, piperidine and oxadiazole. Other functional groups included are an ether, acetamide, and a fluoride.

References

Oxadiazoles
Thiazoles
Piperidines
Acetamides
Ethers
Organofluorides